Dmitri Eduardovich Lobanov (born 11 May 1990) is a Russian professional football player.

Club career
He played in the Russian Football National League for FC Torpedo Vladimir in the 2011–12 season.

External links
 
 
 

1990 births
People from Vladimir Oblast
Living people
Russian footballers
Association football midfielders
FC Moscow players
FC Torpedo Vladimir players
Sportspeople from Vladimir Oblast